Number Six or No. 6 may refer to:

Fictional characters
 Number Six (The Prisoner), the protagonist of the TV series The Prisoner
 Number Six (Battlestar Galactica), a Cylon model in the reimagined TV series Battlestar Galactica
 Number Six or Sayiaka Suzuki, a character from Pani Poni Dash!

Other uses
 "Number Six" (song), a song and mini movie by Alice Nine
 "Number Six", a song by Karate from the album Unsolved
 "Number Six", a colloquialism for the Government of Gibraltar at 6 Convent Place
No.6 Collaborations Project, an album by Ed Sheeran
 #6 or Shawn Crahan, American musician
 No. 6, a series of novels by Atsuko Asano
No.6 Records

See also
 Numbuh 6, a baby skunk appearing in the animated TV series Codename: Kids Next Door
 6 (number)
 Six (disambiguation)
 The Six (disambiguation)